Lately may refer to:

Albums
 Lately (album), by Raymond Cilliers, 2005
 Lately (EP), by Ivy, 1994
 Lately, an EP by Celeste, or the title song, 2019

Songs
 "Lately" (Divine song), 1998; covered by Samantha Mumba, 2001
 "Lately" (Lisa Scott-Lee song), 2003
 "Lately" (Macy Gray song), 2010
 "Lately" (Skunk Anansie song), 1999
 "Lately" (Stevie Wonder song), 1981; covered by Jodeci, 1993
 "Lately" (Tyrese song), 1999
 "Lately", by British Sea Power from The Decline of British Sea Power, 2003
 "Lately", by Brother Clyde from Brother Clyde, 2010
 "Lately", by David Gray from Life in Slow Motion, 2005
 "Lately", by Day of Fire from Losing All, 2010
 "Lately", by Ed Sheeran from No. 5 Collaborations Project, 2011
 "Lately", by Greg Brown from The Poet Game, 1994
 "Lately", by INXS from X, 1990
 "Lately", by Jamila Woods from Heavn, 2016
 "Lately", by Livin Out Loud from What About Us, 2006
 "Lately", by Liz McClarnon
 "Lately", by Massive Attack from Blue Lines, 1991
 "Lately", by Memoryhouse, 2010
 "Lately", by Metronomy from Metronomy Forever, 2019
 "Lately", by Noah Cyrus, 2018
 "Lately", by the Red Hot Chili Peppers, a B-side of "Dani California", 2006
 "Lately", by Soul Asylum from The Silver Lining, 2006
 "Lately", by Soulsavers from Angels & Ghosts, 2015

See also
 "Lately I", a song by Faith Evans, 1999